Moriam Seun Adigun (born 3 January 1987, Chicago, Illinois) is a Nigerian–American bobsledder, and track and field runner who specializes in the 100 metres hurdles.  She competed at the 2012 Summer Olympics, but did not qualify from her heat. In 2016, Seun Adigun founded the Nigerian bobsled team. She represented Nigeria at the 2018 Winter Olympics in two-women bobsled, becoming part of the first-ever Winter Olympians from the country. Seun Adigun was the first ever African athlete who participated both in Summer and Winter Olympics.

Personal life
Adigun is a first cousin once removed of basketball Hall of Famer Hakeem Olajuwon.

International competitions

References

External links
 

1987 births
Living people
African Games gold medalists for Nigeria
African Games medalists in athletics (track and field)
Athletes (track and field) at the 2010 Commonwealth Games
Athletes (track and field) at the 2012 Summer Olympics
Commonwealth Games competitors for Nigeria
Nigerian female hurdlers
Olympic athletes of Nigeria
American sportspeople of Nigerian descent
People from Algonquin, Illinois
Sportspeople from Kane County, Illinois
Sportspeople from the Chicago metropolitan area
Track and field athletes from Illinois
World Athletics Championships athletes for Nigeria
Nigerian female bobsledders
Olympic bobsledders of Nigeria
Bobsledders at the 2018 Winter Olympics
Athletes (track and field) at the 2011 All-Africa Games
University of Houston alumni
Homewood-Flossmoor High School alumni
21st-century Nigerian women